Marc Olden (1933 – 2003) was an American author of mystery and suspense. He is perhaps best remembered for his mystery Poe Must Die, in which 19th-century American author Edgar Allan Poe appears as a protagonist. He was a prolific author, publishing forty books: two non-fiction and thirty-eight fiction.

He was nominated for an Edgar Award for They've Killed Anna, from his popular "Harker File" series about an investigative reporter. In 2000, the Black Caucus of the American Library Association presented Olden with the Literary Fiction Honor Award for his New York crime novel The Ghost.

Early life
Olden was born to African-American parents in Baltimore, Maryland. His father was graphic designer Georg Olden, his mother was actress and model Courtenaye Olden. After Georg was hired as art director for CBS, the Oldens moved to New York City. Olden graduated from Queens College.

Career
Marc Olden started his writing career with two works of non-fiction — a biography of Angela Davis and a study of cocaine in 1970s New York — before turning to the fiction genres of thriller and suspense. Under the pen name Robert Hawkes, Olden began writing the Narc series, which follows a policeman on a counterdrug task force.
During those early years, Olden also produced the novel Black Samurai, which became a film starring Jim Kelly. Olden's novel follows the exploits of Robert Sand, a martial arts expert and the only non-Japanese trained by a Japanese samurai master; it became the first in a successful series. Many of Olden’s eastern-influenced books, such as Giri, Dai-Sho, Gaijin, Oni, Te, Kisaeng, and Krait reflect his lifelong study of the martial arts.  At his death, he held advanced degree black belts in aikido and karate.

Several of his books were optioned for film rights.

Bibliography

Narc novels
(As Robert Hawkes)
 Narc (1973)
 Death of a Courier (1974)
 Death List (1974)
 The Delgado Killings (1974)
 Kill the Dragon (1974)
 The Beauty Kill (1975)
 Corsican Death (1975)
 Death Song (1975)
 Kill for It (1975)

Black Samurai novels
 Black Samurai (1974)
 The Golden Kill (1974)
 Killer Warrior (1974)
 The Deadly Pearl (1974)
 The Inquisition (1974)
 The Warlock (1975)
 Sword of Allah (1975)
 The Katana (1975)

The Harker File novels
 The Harker File (1976)
 Dead and Paid For (1976)
 They’ve Killed Anna (1977)
 Kill the Reporter (1978)

Other novels
 Wellington's (1977)
 The Informant (1978)
 Poe Must Die (1978)
 Gossip (1979)
 Book of Shadows (1980)
 Choices (1980) (As Leslie Crafford)
 A Dangerous Glamour (1982)
 Giri (1982)
 The Unvanquished (1983) (As Terry Nelsen Bonner)
 Dai-sho (1983)
 Gaijin (1986)
 Oni (1987)
 Sword of Vengeance (1990)
 Kisaeng (1991)
 Krait (1992)
 Fear's Justice (1996)
 The Ghost (1999)

Non fiction
 Angela Davis (1973)
 Cocaine (1973)

References

External links
 
 

1933 births
2003 deaths
Writers from Baltimore
Writers from New York City
20th-century American novelists
21st-century American novelists
African-American novelists
American male novelists
American mystery novelists
American thriller writers
Queens College, City University of New York alumni
20th-century American male writers
21st-century American male writers
Novelists from New York (state)
Novelists from Maryland
20th-century African-American writers
21st-century African-American writers
African-American male writers